Santa Cruz do Capibaribe is a Brazilian municipality in the State of Pernambuco. It is the third largest city in the mesoregion of Agreste of Pernambuco with a population of 109,897 inhabitants in 2020. It has 335.309 km² (208.5 square miles) of total area and it is located about 185.7 km (115.4 miles) from the capital Recife.

The city is famous for its textile industry together with Caruaru and Toritama.

Geography

 State - Pernambuco
 Region - Agreste of Pernambuco
 Boundaries - Brejo da Madre de Deus and Jataúba (S), Taquaritinga do Norte (E), Paraiba (N and W).
 Area - 335.5 km2
 Elevation - 438 m
 Hydrography - Capibaribe River
 Vegetation - Caatinga hipoxerofila.
 Climate - Semi desertic
 Annual average temperature - 23.4 c
 Main road -  BR 203, BR 104 and PE 130
 Distance to Recife - 185 km

Economy

The main economic activities in Santa Cruz do Capibaribe are related with the textile industry (employs 41%) and general commerce.

Economic Indicators

Economy by Sector
2006

Health Indicators

References

Municipalities in Pernambuco